Li Yun, popularly known as Sunny Li, is a Chinese concert pianist. Based in London, Li studied at the Royal Academy of Music and Royal Northern College of Music prior to performing at venues around Europe.

Biography
In 2011, Sunny Li released a piano solo album 昀韵, which included works from composers such as Frédéric Chopin, Franz Liszt and Moritz Moszkowski. She performed at the Steinway-Haus in Munich, Germany with fellow pianist Assel Abilseitova the same year.

In September 2014, Li founded the Migjorn Quartet, which placed third in the Hirsh Prize Chamber Music Competition. In January 2017, Li played "Flight of the Bumblebee" on two pianos at the same time. The video, posted on Facebook by Classic FM, garnered over a million views with mixed reactions from viewers.

Awards
 2007 – The Third Rising Star International Piano Competition, "Gold Award"
 2013 – Schoenfeld International Piano Competition, "Elite Award"
 2015 – British Royal Northern College of Music Concerto Competition, Winner
 2016 – Grand Prize Virtuoso International Music Competition, Second place
 56th Grotrain-Steinweg Schumann International Competition, Winner
 59th French International Music Festival, France, French Nice Festival Solo Awards

References

External links
 

1991 births
Living people
Alumni of the Royal Academy of Music
Chinese classical pianists
Chinese women pianists
Women classical pianists
21st-century classical pianists
Chinese emigrants to England
21st-century women pianists